Winfield is a city and county seat of Cowley County, Kansas, United States.  It is situated along the Walnut River in South Central Kansas.  As of the 2020 census, the population of the city was 11,777.  It is home to Southwestern College.

History

19th century
Winfield was founded in 1870. It was named for Rev. Winfield Scott, who promised to build the town a church in exchange for the naming rights.  The first post office at Winfield was established in May, 1870.  In 1873, Winfield incorporated as a city.

Railroads
Railroads reached Winfield in the late 1870s, and finished at Arkansas City in 1881. Eventually, a total of five railroads passed through Winfield.

State mental hospital
In 1881, the State of Kansas established the Kansas State Asylum for Idiotic and Imbecile Youth, temporarily established at Lawrence, but moved to Winfield in 1887/1888, where it served as a dominant local employer for 117 years.

20th century
The Winfield-Arkansas City area became an industrial community in the 20th century, manufacturing consumer goods, and eventually aircraft and aircraft parts, while retaining its traditional dominant employer, the Winfield State Hospital.

On August 13, 1903, 30-year-old Gilbert Twigg, armed with a 12-gauge double-barrelled shotgun, opened fire at a concert, killing six people and wounding at least 25, before killing himself. Three others died in hospitals afterward.

Strother Field
In World War II, Winfield, along with neighboring Arkansas City, became home to a military pilot training base, Strother Field, which remained in operation until the end of the war, bringing several thousand military personnel into the area. After the war, in the early 1950s, the field became the shared municipal airport and industrial park for Winfield and neighboring Arkansas City.

Aviation industry
The aircraft manufacturing industry in nearby Wichita ( to the north)—one of the world's principal aircraft-manufacturing centers—provided employment for many Winfield residents, directly and indirectly. That opportunity grew substantially in the last half of the century, as General Electric's GE Aviation division, in the late 1940s, began producing engines for Wichita aircraft, and eventually in the 1960s, one of Wichita's principal manufacturers, Cessna Aircraft Company built a factory at Winfield's Strother Field.

Crayola
The crayola plant, near Winfield, was established in 1952. At the time, it was the only crayola plant that made paints. The plant made a large part of the jobs in the county. Tours were conducted until 1992, and 5 years later, in 1997, the plant shut down and moved to Pennsylvania. A lot of original crayons and memorabilia can still be seen at the Winfield museum.

Institutions
The Winfield State Hospital and Training Center, established in the community in the prior century to house and confine the mentally ill and developmentally disabled, remained as a dominant local employer throughout the 20th century. Towards the end of the century the (now designated "Winfield State Hospital and Training Center") housed developmentally disabled people. Social, political and legal changes, led to closing of most of the facility in 1998. It was gradually turned into the Winfield Correctional Facility.

Southwestern College grew to become a leading local institution and employer, drawing students from throughout the central United States, and bringing an extra level of intellectual and cultural development and diversity to the community.

Pi Gamma Mu International Honor Society in Social Sciences was founded at Southwestern College in Winfield in 1924. The international headquarters is now housed at a repurposed Carnegie Library building on Millington Street in downtown Winfield. Pi Gamma Mu is the oldest and preeminent interdisciplinary social science honor society. Its mission is to encourage and promote excellence in the Social Sciences and to uphold and nurture scholarship, leadership, and service.

21st century
In the 21st century, Winfield remained an industrial and institutional town. With the exception of Cessna, most of the area's major employers (some under new names and ownership) continued into the early 21st century.

Geography
Winfield is situated along the Walnut River at its confluence with Timber Creek. State highway route K-15 follows U.S. Route 77 to the north of the city and U.S. Route 160 to the east. K-360 is a bypass around the southeastern part of the city between U.S. Route 77 and U.S. Route 160.

Climate
The maximum temperature reaches  an average of 69 days per year and reaches  an average of 12 days per year. The minimum temperature falls below the freezing point (32 °F) an average of 102 days per year. Typically the first fall freeze occurs between early October and the first week of November, and the last spring freeze occurs during the month of April.

There are on average 90 days of measurable precipitation per year. Measurable snowfall occurs an average of 7 days per year with at least an inch of snow being received on four of those days. Snow depth of at least an inch occurs an average of 11 days per year.

Demographics

2010 census
As of the census of 2010, there were 12,301 people, 4,600 households, and 2,848 families residing in the city. The racial makeup of the city was 85.7% White, 3.9% African American, 1.3% Native American, 3.9% Asian, 1.8% from other races, and 3.4% from two or more races. Hispanic or Latino people of any race were 6.1% of the population.

There were 4,600 households, of which 32.0% had children under the age of 18 living with them, 44.7% were married couples living together, 12.2% had a female householder with no husband present, 5.1% had a male householder with no wife present, and 38.1% were non-families. 32.5% of all households were made up of individuals, and 13.8% had someone living alone who was 65 years of age or older. The average household size was 2.37 and the average family size was 2.98.

The median age in the city was 36.7 years. 23% of residents were under the age of 18; 12% were between the ages of 18 and 24; 25% were from 25 to 44; 24.4% were from 45 to 64; and 15.7% were 65 years of age or older. The gender makeup of the city was 50.7% male and 49.3% female.

2000 census
As of the census of 2000, there were 12,206 people, 4,627 households, and 2,952 families residing in the city. The racial makeup of the city was 88.06% White, 3.26% Black or African American, 1.08% Native American, 3.74% Asian, 0.02% Pacific Islander, 1.73% from other races, and 2.12% from two or more races. Hispanic or Latino people of any race were 4.66% of the population.

There were 4,627 households, out of which 31.9% had children under the age of 18 living with them, 49.6% were married couples living together, 10.7% had a female householder with no husband present, and 36.2% were non-families. 32.4% of all households were made up of individuals, and 16.9% had someone living alone who was 65 years of age or older. The average household size was 2.36 and the average family size was 3.00.

In the city, the population was spread out, with 24.9% under the age of 18, 11.8% from 18 to 24, 27.4% from 25 to 44, 19.4% from 45 to 64, and 16.6% who were 65 years of age or older. The median age was 36 years. For every 100 females, there were 98.5 males. For every 100 females age 18 and over, there were 97.0 males.

The median income for a household in the city was $34,443, and the median income for a family was $44,539. Males had a median income of $31,768 versus $21,605 for females. The per capita income for the city was $19,162. About 9.9% of families and 13.8% of the population were below the poverty line, including 18.6% of those under age 18 and 11.4% of those age 65 or over.

Economy

19th century

Railroads
In 1877, the Florence, El Dorado, and Walnut Valley Railroad Company built a branch line from Florence to El Dorado. The line was extended to Douglass then reached Winfield on October 1, 1879, and finished at Arkansas City in 1881. The line was leased and operated by the Atchison, Topeka and Santa Fe Railway. The line from Florence to El Dorado was abandoned in 1942. The original branch line connected Florence, Burns, De Graff, El Dorado, Augusta, Douglass, Rock, Akron, Winfield, Arkansas City.

The Southern Kansas and Western Railroad was completed from the east to Winfield on February 17, 1880, then continued westward, and it reached the western county line on March 16. This railroad changed its name over time as it merged or purchased by other railroads.

Eventually, a total of five railroads passed through Winfield.

State mental hospital
In 1881, The Kansas Constitution stated that the care, treatment, and education of the handicapped were responsibilities of public residential institutions. Accordingly, the Kansas State Asylum for Idiotic and Imbecile Youth was temporarily established at Lawrence, moving to Winfield in 1887.

The Kansas State Imbecile Asylum (later the Winfield State Hospital and Training Center) was established in the community in 1888, on a hill overlooking the city. For the next 117 years, it served as a dominant local employer, housing and confining those with mental problems from throughout the state of Kansas.

20th century

Industry
The Winfield-Arkansas City area has a wide range of industrial employers—most of which emerged and developed in the 20th century. Many are based at, and around, Strother Field—a municipal airport that the two cities share.

Consumer goods
In 1916, Gott Manufacturing was established in Winfield to produce metal water coolers. Over the next 70 years, the enterprise grew into a major supplier of insulated water jugs and urns.

In 1986, Gott was acquired by Rubbermaid, a globally dominant manufacturer of rubber storage containers, and converted to producing Rubbermaid-branded products, manufacturing insulated water coolers, ice chests, outdoor-living and outdoor-storage products. Subsequent expansion of its facilities have continued into the present day.

A Crayola crayon-manufacturing plant was located in Winfield from 1952 to 1997.

Aviation industry

Strother Field
In 1942, as America entered World War II, Winfield, along with neighboring Arkansas City, began development of a shared municipal airport. However, the entry of the U.S. into the war led to military acquisition and completion of the airfield, which became Strother Field. During the war, the airfield was used for military pilot training.

In 1953, the airport reverted to shared control of Winfield and Arkansas City, and became a major industrial center for both communities, which it remains to the present.

GE Aviation
In 1951, at Strother Field, GE Aviation—an aircraft-engine division of General Electric—began producing General Electric J47 jet engines for U.S. military aircraft (notably the Boeing B-47 Stratojet intercontinental bomber, built primarily in Wichita, and also built by Douglas Aircraft at Tulsa in neighboring Oklahoma). Approximately 3,000 of those engines were produced at Strother by 1955.

With the end of the Korean War, the GE factory switched to overhauling jet engine parts and accessories. In 1962, GE began overhauling and repairing entire military jet engines (particularly J73 and J85), and related parts and accessories—ultimately processing over 6,000 jet engines between 1962 and 1975.

With the advent of business jets in the mid-1960s—led by Wichita's Learjet (using General Electric CJ-610 engines, also used on other business aircraft)—the Strother Field GE facility switched to servicing GE's business jet engines, ultimately processing over 6,000 by 1975, as the factory grew to 125,000 square feet. During those years, several hundred business jets, from around the world, flew into Strother Field to be serviced directly at the GE facility.

Subsequently, GE's Strother facility overhauled J33 military engines, and General Electric CF6 engines for "jumbo" jetliners.

In 1985, GE acquired much of the abandoned Cessna facility for use in its engine-overhaul enterprise.

Cessna
In 1967, Cessna Aircraft Company, the world's highest-volume producer of aircraft (mostly light aircraft, at the time) addressed booming demand for their smallest, most-popular aircraft, by opening a Cessna factory at Strother Field. Initially, the factory produced the Cessna 150, at that time the world's most popular two-seat light aircraft (the world's dominant pilot-training aircraft for several decades).

In 1975, Cessna also began to move the assembly of the world's most popular light aircraft, the Cessna 172, from its Wichita factory to Strother Field.

Several thousand of both aircraft models were produced at Strother Field (making it a globally major aircraft factory complex, in total unit production). The factory employed several hundred to a few thousand workers until the 1980s Recession and other factors crashed the market for light aircraft, and Cessna, following layoffs of 700 workers at Strother Field, eventually shut down the Strother Field factory in the early 1980s.

Institutions
The Winfield State Hospital and Training Center, established in the community in the prior century to house and confine the mentally ill and developmentally disabled, remained as a dominant local employer throughout the 20th century, housing and confining those with mental problems from throughout the state of Kansas—housing up to 1,492 "patients" at its maximum in 1952.

Towards the end of the century the (now designated "Winfield State Hospital and Training Center") housed developmentally disabled people. Changing social and political attitudes, and SCOTUS decisions, and conservative political economics (developmentally disabled persons supported in the community cost the state $25,000 annually, versus $130,000 for confinement in the Winfield facility), led to the gradual closing of most of the facility—over heated protests from residents' families and local community leaders. In 1998, the Kansas Legislature officially voted to close it. At that time, it was the oldest and largest of the three Kansas state hospitals for developmentally disabled persons. When the closure of the facility was announced in 1997, the patient population had declined to only 250 residents.

The facility was gradually taken over by the Kansas Department of Corrections, and repurposed as the Winfield Correctional Facility, expanded to contain up to 556 prisoners.

21st century
With the exception of Cessna, most of the area's major employers (some under new names and ownership) continued into the early 21st century. The Strother Field municipal airport remains the site of the area's principal industrial park, employing thousands.

In 2010, the Keystone-Cushing Pipeline (Phase II) was constructed west of Winfield, north to south through Cowley County, with much controversy over tax exemption and environmental concerns (if a leak ever occurs).

In 2011–2012, Rubbermaid (now Newell Rubbermaid) announced it was moving 200 jobs from a Texas factory to Winfield, increasing its Winfield capacity to add manufacturing of Rubbermaid's trash cans and home-organization products. Further, Rubbermaid would invest $26.6 million to expand its operations, beginning construction of a 500,000-square-foot distribution center next to its factory. In early 2017, the company was employing 1,054 people

GE Aviation, which began Winfield operations in 1947, continued, generally, until the present day, (according to a local government statement online in April 2017), now employing 750 people in the area.

Creekstone Farms beef processing plant, in neighboring Arkansas City, Kansas, employed over 600 in early 2017.

Hospitals and nursing-care facilities in Winfield and Arkansas City, combined, employed over 600 workers in early 2017—about half at William Newton Memorial Hospital in Winfield.

The Winfield Correctional Facility employed another 200.

Arts and culture

Entertainment
Winfield is well known for hosting the Walnut Valley Festival, one of the nation's oldest and largest bluegrass and acoustic music festivals, on the third weekend of every September. Crowds have exceeded 15,000, arriving from around the nation—with hundreds of the bluegrass and acoustic music enthusiasts camping, socializing and "jamming" at the site for weeks before the festival begins. The event also often features folk music and Celtic music performances, and related cultural activities and exhibits.

Education

Primary and secondary education
The community is served by Winfield USD 465 public school district, which operates Winfield High School.

College
Southwestern College is located in Winfield. It is a four-year private higher educational institution affiliated with the United Methodist Church.

St. John's College was located in Winfield before it closed in 1986.

Media

Print
 The Cowley Courier Traveler for both Winfield and Arkansas City, formed by the merger of The Winfield Daily Courier and The Arkansas City Traveler

Radio
 KKLE, 1550 AM, News/Talk
 KBDD, 91.9 FM, Religious
 KSWC, 94.7 FM, College (low power)
 KSOK, 95.9 FM, Country
 KSOK, 103.3 FM, Classic Hits (translator for KSOK-AM)
 KSOK-AM, 1280 AM, Classic Hits
 KWLS, 107.9 FM, Country

In popular media
 Fictional character Mary Ann Summers (played by Dawn Wells) in the television series Gilligan's Island is from Winfield.
 Winfield is mentioned in the television series iCarly season three episode four iSell Penny Tees minute 3:33

Notable people

 Robert A. Alberty, biophysical chemist
 Bob Brannum, basketball player
 Gilbert Bundy (1911–1955), cartoonist and illustrator
 Darren E. Burrows, artist, director and actor; most notably Ed Chigliak in the television series Northern Exposure
 Josh Clarke, baseball player
 Harold Corbin, Olympian in fencing
 Ira Davenport, Olympic bronze medal winner in track and field
 Greta Goodwin, member Kansas Senate and Kansas House of Representatives
 John Harts, football coach
 Bob Kenney, University of Kansas NCAA National Men's Basketball Championship team in 1952, 1952 Olympic gold medal
 Richard Mawdsley, artist known for his work in metalsmithing
 Ruth Maycliffe (1888-1981), Broadway actress
 Guy McAfee (1888-1960), law enforcement officer, owner of brothels and gambling saloons in Los Angeles and co-founder of casinos in Las Vegas
 George McDermott, U.S. federal judge
 Eugene Pallette, actor; appeared in over 240 silent era and sound era motion pictures
 Steve Sidwell, football coach
 Dean Strother, U.S. Air Force four-star general; Commander in Chief of North American Air Defense Command and Continental Air Defense Command
 Caroline Thorington, artist
 Karen Wheeler, artist

See also
 National Register of Historic Places listings in Cowley County, Kansas
 List of Kansas railroads

References

Further reading

External links

 
 
 Winfield – Directory of Public Officials
 Winfield city map, KDOT
 

Cities in Kansas
County seats in Kansas
Cities in Cowley County, Kansas
Wichita, KS Metropolitan Statistical Area
Micropolitan areas of Kansas
Populated places established in 1870
1870 establishments in Kansas